Fourman Hill is a hill located west of Bogniebrae, Aberdeenshire, Scotland.

A cairn near the sumit marked the historical boundary of Rothiemay and Huntly parishes.

There is a possible site of a Roman Camp on the hill. Suggestions of a Roman road were thought to be unlikely: "There are faint traces of an old road on the Fourman Hill in this Parish which is supposed to be the Roman Road which led between the Camp on the Spey and the Camp near Glenmellan in Forgue parish, the traces in this parish resemble rather those of an old bridle road than a Roman Road being only about ten to twenty links wide & crooked, no other traces whatever are visible along its supposed course in Huntly parish."

References

Mountains and hills of Aberdeenshire